Nizami Ramzi ogly Bakshiyev, also known as Nizami Ramzi (December 20, 1947 in Baku, Soviet Union – January 19, 1997 in Baku, Azerbaijan), was a performer of Azerbaijani meykhana music.

Biography
After finishing technical school in 1967, Ramzi started his career as driver. In 1988, he created "Meykhana" folklore ensemble. In 1991, he was filmed in Gazalkhan movie. On January 19, 1997, Ramzi with meykhana performer Kabir was killed in a motor vehicle accident.

References

1947 births
1997 deaths
20th-century Azerbaijani male singers
Meykhana musicians
Road incident deaths in Azerbaijan